Tarek Jabban (born 11 December 1975) is a Syrian former footballer. He last played for Al-Jaish, which competes in the Syrian Premier League, the top division in Syria. He played as a defender, wearing the shirt with number 5 for Al-Jaish. He was a member and captain of the Syria national football team.

Club career
Jabban started his career at Al-Majd, then he transferred to the Syrian League giants Al-Jaish.

He was loaned out two times: in 2003 played for Kuwaiti club Al-Jahra for six months, and he signed a 6-month contract with Iranian club Persepolis in 2006.

International career
He was a member and captain of the Syria national football team.

International goals

Coaching career
He was the assistant coach at Al-Jaish, then Syria in 2018–19. He later became the head coach at Al-Jaish, Taliya and Tishreen.

References

External links
 
 
 

1975 births
Living people
Sportspeople from Damascus
Syrian footballers
Syria international footballers
al-Majd players
Al-Jaish Damascus players
Persepolis F.C. players
Al Jahra SC players
Syrian expatriate footballers
Expatriate footballers in Iran
Syrian expatriate sportspeople in Iran
1996 AFC Asian Cup players
Association football defenders
Syrian Premier League players
Al-Jaish Damascus managers
Persian Gulf Pro League players